Atrophaneura sycorax is a species of butterfly from the family Papilionidae that is found from southern Burma to Peninsular Malaysia, and in Sumatra and western Java.

The wingspan is 130–140 mm. The wings are black. There is a wide dull-white marking on each of the hindwings. The body is completely covered in yellow hair. Females can be black or dark brown. The wing veins are bordered in white.

The larvae feed on Aristolochia species: A. cathcartii, A. coadunata, A. singalangensis and Thottea species.

Subspecies
Atrophaneura sycorax sycorax (Sumatra)
Atrophaneura sycorax egertoni (Distant, 1886) (southern Burma to Peninsular Malaya)
Atrophaneura sycorax pariwononis Tsukada & Nishiyama (western Java)

References

External links
External images of holotype

Butterflies described in 1885
Atrophaneura
Butterflies of Java
Butterflies of Asia
Taxa named by Henley Grose-Smith